Metro Railway, Kolkata, is the owner and operator of Kolkata Metro, the oldest metro system of India. On 29 December 2010, it became the 17th zone of the Indian Railways, operated by the Ministry of Railways.

History 

In 1969, the Metropolitan Transport Project was formed under Indian Railways. In 1971, MTP proposed to build 5 rapid transit lines for Kolkata. With help of Soviet specialists (Lenmetroproekt) and East German engineers, prepared a master plan to provide metro lines for the city of Kolkata, totaling a route length of 97.5 km in 1971.

Lines 
Currently it owns and operates Kolkata Metro Line 1 and operates 2. It will operate other lines (3, 4, 5, 6) after their completion. From July 2019, KMRC handed over the operations of Line 2 to Metro Railway, Kolkata.

Construction

Under Metro Railway, Kolkata 
It is currently constructing the Kolkata Metro Line 4. It is a 16.876 km long line from Noapara to Barasat.

Total sanctioned projects 
No. of projects: 6
Total length: 
Sanctioned cost: 
Expenditure:   (up to March 2019)
Budget outlay (2019-20):

Departments 

 Accounts
 Electrical
 Vigilance
 Traffic
 Engineering
 Signalling
 Personnel
 Medical
 Stores

Magazine 
Metro Chetna, a e-magazine published in Hindi, every 3 months by Metro Railway, Kolkata. It was first published in 2017, and discontinued in 2018.

Durga Puja arrangements 
Some special arrangements and services are made especially during Durga Puja and Depavali every year. These are-

 Greeting passengers along with commercial displays 
 Distribution of pamphlets among pandal hoppers showing names of important puja pandals around the 24 stations 
 Affixing of posters at earmarked locations inside 24 stations displaying names of important Puja pandals 
 Vinyl stickers conveying festive greetings 
 Placement of directional boards, showing names of well-known puja pandals for better crowd management

See also 

 Indian Railways
 Kolkata Metro
 Kolkata Metro Rail Corporation
 Zones and divisions of Indian Railways

References 

1969 establishments in West Bengal
Zones of Indian Railways
Kolkata Metro